Sommera is a genus of flowering plants belonging to the family Rubiaceae.

Its native range is from Mexico to Peru. It is also found in northern Brazil, Colombia, Costa Rica, Ecuador, Guatemala, Honduras, Nicaragua and Panamá. 

The genus name of Sommera is in honour of Christian Niefeldt Sommer (1821–1878), an English entomologist, who supported the research of author of the genus, Diederich Friedrich Carl von Schlechtendal. It was first described and published in Linnaea Vol.9 on page 602 in 1835.

Known species
According to Kew:
Sommera arborescens 
Sommera chiapensis 
Sommera cusucoana 
Sommera donnell-smithii 
Sommera fusca 
Sommera grandis 
Sommera guatemalensis 
Sommera montana 
Sommera parva 
Sommera purdiei 
Sommera sabiceoides

References

Dialypetalantheae
Rubiaceae genera
Plants described in 1835
Flora of Mexico
Flora of Central America
Flora of Colombia
Flora of Ecuador
Flora of Peru
Flora of North Brazil